(2R)-2-Methylpent-4-enoic acid is an organic acid with the chemical formula C6H10O2. Other names for this molecule include (R)-2-methyl-4-pentenoic acid, (R)-(−)-2-methyl-4-pentenoic acid, and methylallylacetic acid.

Synthesis 
(R)-2-Methylpent-4-enoic acid can be synthesized using a chiral auxiliary such an oxazolidinone derivative, popularized by David Evans. One route of synthesis consists of three steps:

 acylation of the oxazolidinone using triethylamine as a base, and DMAP as an acyl carrier catalyst
 addition of a pentene group via enolate addition using Sodium bis(trimethylsilyl)amide as a base and allyl iodide as the pentene donor
 and cleavage of the oxazolidinone by LiOH solution in hydrogen peroxide. and sulfite to reduce the peroxide to the acid.

Uses 
(R)-2-Methylpent-4-enoic acid can also be used in synthesis of other chiral compounds. For example, it has been used in the process of synthesizing the drug Sacubitril as a reagent for adding a chiral center to the molecule.

References 

Carboxylic acids
Alkene derivatives